Delta is a municipality in the Thessaloniki regional unit, Central Macedonia, Greece. The seat of the municipality is the town Sindos. The municipality of Delta covers an area of 311.09 km2.

Municipality
The municipality Delta was formed at the 2011 local government reform by the merger of the following 3 former municipalities, that became municipal units:
Axios
Chalastra
Echedoros

It took its name from the Delta (estuary) of Axios river.

References

Municipalities of Central Macedonia
Populated places in Thessaloniki (regional unit)